Kerala Farmers Federation (KeFF) is a non-profit agricultural organization established in 2017. It consists of over 670,000 farmers and 1,400,000 workers, and spreads awareness about farmer rights, sustainable farming practices, trade agreements and laws concerning farming and holding of land.

References 

Cooperatives in Kerala
2017 establishments in Kerala
Organizations established in 2017
Agricultural cooperatives in India